Sunday is a current affairs programme broadcast on TVNZ 1 in New Zealand on Sunday nights at . Presented by Miriama Kamo with a team of New Zealand reporters, the programme began when TV ONE did not renew its rights to 60 Minutes which had aired previously in this time slot. The hour-long show usually features two reports from the local reporters and one report from an overseas current affairs programme. The programme's tagline is "Where there's a story we'll find it".

In 2012, the show was reduced to half an hour and moved to a new time slot of 7.00pm due to the New Zealand's Got Talent series. TVNZ also reviewed the future of the show. In May 2014, the show returned to an hour time slot.

Reporters 
 Mark Crysell
 Tamati Rimene-Sproat
 Tania Page
 Mava Moayyed
 Kristin Hall

External links
 Television New Zealand

References

2000s New Zealand television series
2010s New Zealand television series
2020s New Zealand television series
2002 New Zealand television series debuts
New Zealand television news shows
TVNZ 1 original programming